This is a list of Hindi-language magazines.

See also
 List of magazines in India

Notes and references

 
Hindi-language literature
Hindi magazines
Hindi
Hindi language-related lists
Hindi